Kathy Kozachenko (born 1953) is an American politician who was the first openly lesbian or gay candidate to run successfully for political office in the United States. Kozachenko ran on the ticket of the Human Rights Party (HRP), the local, left-wing third party, which had already succeeded in winning two Ann Arbor, Michigan, council seats in 1972.

Biography 
Born in Alexandria, Virginia, Kozachenko moved around during her youth. From Toledo, Ohio, she would eventually make it to Plymouth, Michigan. She joined the Human Rights Party (HRP) in the early 1970s. Kozachenko is of Ukrainian descent.

Kozachenko was an out student at the University of Michigan, where she received support for her progressive agenda, which included a fine of no more than five dollars for possession of small amounts of marijuana. Another part of her platform included "a ceiling on the amount of profit a landlord could make from rents on a building".

Running solely against a liberal Democrat, the 21-year-old Kozachenko was elected to the Ann Arbor City Council on April 2, 1974. She won the seat "representing the city's second ward by fifty-two votes".

Kozachenko's HRP predecessors on the city council, Nancy Wechsler and Jerry DeGrieck, had come out as a lesbian and gay man during their first and only terms on the city council, thus becoming the first openly LGBT public-office holders in the United States; however, Wechsler and DeGrieck did not run for office as an open lesbian and gay individual.

References

Living people
20th-century American politicians
20th-century American women politicians
Lesbian politicians
American LGBT city council members
American LGBT rights activists
Women city councillors in Michigan
LGBT people from Michigan
LGBT people from Virginia
Politicians from Ann Arbor, Michigan
Michigan city council members
Human Rights Party (United States) politicians
American people of Ukrainian descent
University of Michigan alumni
21st-century American women
1953 births